Liceo musicale e coreutico (literally artistic lyceum) is a type of secondary school in Italy. It is specifically devoted to music and dance related topics. Students can attend the liceo musicale e coreutico after successfully completing middle school (scuola media).

The curriculum is devised by the Ministry of Education, and emphasises the link between art, music, and dance. It covers a complete and widespread range of disciplines.

Students typically study for five years, and attend the school from the age of 14 to 19. At the end of the fifth year all students sit for the esame di Stato, a final examination which gave access to every university course.

A student attending a liceo is called liceale, although the more generic terms studente (male) and studentessa (female) are also in common use. Teachers are known as professore (male) or professoressa (female).

See also
List of schools in Italy

References

Education in Italy
School types